Shout at the Devil is the second studio album by American heavy metal band Mötley Crüe, released on September 26, 1983. It was the band's breakthrough album, establishing Mötley Crüe as one of the top selling heavy metal acts of the 1980s. The singles "Looks That Kill" and "Too Young to Fall in Love" were moderate hits for the band.

Overview
Shout at the Devil was Mötley Crüe's breakthrough success, selling 200,000 copies in its first two weeks.  The album's title and the band's use of a pentagram caused a great deal of controversy upon its 1983 release, as Christian and conservative groups claimed the band was encouraging their listeners to worship Satan. The Pentagram was something Nikki Sixx brought with him from Sister, a very theatrical band he had been a member of (along with future W.A.S.P. vocalist Blackie Lawless) in the late 1970s prior to the formation of Mötley Crüe. Sister were the first L.A. band to fuse occult symbolism such as the Pentagram into a theatrical heavy metal show incorporating blood and facial makeup. Sixx asked Lawless for permission to use some of Sister's occult-related imagery for Shout at the Devil, as at that point Lawless was intent on moving in a different direction. "I said 'take whatever you want' because at that point, I realised that with an image like that, you end up painting yourself in a corner and you can't get out," said Lawless.

Just prior to returning home to Los Angeles to begin recording the album, Mötley Crüe was famously kicked off their support spot on Kiss' Creatures of the Night tour. The bands played only five shows together before Gene Simmons demanded they be replaced, citing their "bad behavior".

During recording, bassist Sixx was involved in a serious car crash after drunkenly stealing a friend's Porsche in Los Angeles. At around the same time, actress and friend Demi Moore told Sixx he needed Alcoholics Anonymous, though Sixx dismissed her concerns. Sixx badly injured his shoulder in the crash and was prescribed Percocet, a combination of acetaminophen and the powerful opioid oxycodone which was commonly prescribed to treat severe short-term pain. Sixx's use of Percocet transitioned directly to a crippling addiction to heroin which would cost him $3,500 a day and almost claim his life later in the decade.

As the band toured with Ozzy Osbourne in support of Shout at the Devil, they discussed replacing guitarist Mick Mars. Mars was several years older than the other members of the band, and his bandmates were eager to add a more technically proficient guitarist in the vein of Yngwie Malmsteen. Bob Daisley, Osbourne's bassist, was present during the tour-bus discussion and told the band "do not try to fix something that isn't broken" when asked for his opinion. Daisley has said the band was serious at that time about replacing the guitarist.

As the tour continued, the band was invited to take part in the 1984 Monsters of Rock festival supporting headliners Van Halen and AC/DC. Guitarist Eddie Van Halen was bitten by Vince Neil during a dinner, with drummer Tommy Lee also biting Malcolm Young at some point. Van Halen and Young were both reportedly furious over this behaviour. Lee also became involved in a fistfight with David Lee Roth which saw Mötley Crüe expelled from their hotel. AC/DC and Van Halen both subsequently demanded Mötley Crüe be removed from the bill, but the band's popularity at that time made such a move difficult. The promoter came up with an unusual solution: Mötley Crüe would enter their trailer immediately upon arrival at the concert venue, and a large crane would then lift the trailer several meters off the ground to prevent the band members from leaving and causing trouble prior to their performance. They would also be required to leave the concert venue immediately following their performance. "You apologized every day", said manager Doc McGhee of Mötley Crüe's behaviour during this period, which eventually resulted in him having to pay a $15,000 deposit before any hotel would allow the band to stay. McGhee also established a rule in which each band member would submit to him a list of everything they had destroyed in a hotel before he'd allow them to check out.

It was an article published in the June 1984 issue of Hit Parader magazine that brought the band's shocking antics to national attention for the first time. Andy Secher, the magazine's editor, traveled to Mexico for an interview with the band and was shocked to find "this young woman, spread eagle on the bed, naked, and they're going at her with a wine bottle". Though Secher had to heavily sanitize the story before it could be printed, the depiction of the band's behaviour nonetheless shocked America and created a firestorm of controversy which saw some retailers threaten to remove the magazine from its shelves. The magazine not only survived, but soon saw its readership increase dramatically, with Secher saying "We happened to hit perfectly with Mötley Crüe. That June issue was on the stands in April, just when Shout At The Devil was peaking."

"Looks That Kill" was a moderate hit for the band and played a large role in exposing the band to a wider audience. The music video produced for the song was shot over the course of an 18-hour day on the main sound stage at A&M Records in Los Angeles. Model Wendy Barry, who portrayed the "warrior princess" in the "Looks That Kill" music video, has said her experience with the band was very positive, describing Mötley Crüe as "all very nice. Really down-to-earth and fun", in stark contrast with their growing reputation for depravity. While Barry acknowledges the music video "generated a stir", she later said of it "I personally thought it was just a well-executed video as far as production, and the song was killer." A year later Barry would appear again with Sixx and Lee in the music video for Ratt's "Back For More".
 
The song "Bastard" was targeted by Tipper Gore and the PMRC, who were behind the move to have warning labels placed on albums with lyrics or other content they found disturbing. According to Mick Mars, the song wasn't a call to violence but rather was about "a certain person that we used to work with that we felt we were stabbed in the back by."

"Knock 'Em Dead, Kid" was inspired by a violent encounter between Sixx and a group of Hells Angels. Sixx somehow wound up in a fight with a group of bikers, even hitting one member in the face with a chain he had been wearing as a belt. The Hells Angels turned out to be undercover cops, and the bassist was subsequently badly beaten and jailed, resulting in a black eye and broken cheekbone. After being released from jail, he was inspired to write a song about the ordeal.

The album also features a cover of The Beatles' 1968 song "Helter Skelter", a song that allegedly inspired cult leader Charles Manson. Sixx was not a Beatles' fan, referring to the band as "fucking wimpy", but he  lists "Helter Skelter" and The White Album among his favorites of all time.

Reception

In a contemporary review for The Village Voice, Robert Christgau panned Shout at the Devil and felt the band's commercial appeal lay in false braggadocio on an album that is poor "even by heavy metal standards". Rolling Stone'''s J. D. Considine found their style of rock formulaic, innocuous, and unoriginal: "The whole point of bands like Motley Crue is to provide cheap thrills to jaded teens, and that's where the album ultimately disappoints." In The Rolling Stone Album Guide (2004), he dismissed the music as "a distressingly mild-mannered distillation of Kiss and Aerosmith clichés". In 2017, the same magazine would later go on to rank the album at 44th, in the list of "The 100 Greatest Metal Albums of All Time". On the contrary, Dave Constable of Metal Forces wrote that Mötley Crüe had "possibly come up with the major label metal LP of '83."

AllMusic's Barry Weber was more positive in a retrospective review, referring to the album as their best, displaying Mötley Crüe's "sleazy and notorious (yet quite entertaining) metal at its best." Canadian journalist Martin Popoff considered Shout at the Devil inferior to Mötley's debut album, but found its music extremely addictive if unoriginal, calling it "punk rocking lobotomy metal". Adrian Begrand of PopMatters called the album a sleazy and menacing "timeless L.A. metal classic". In his opinion, the album contained the band's best singles and "remains to this day Mötley Crüe's finest hour".

Ultimate Classic Rock's Eduardo Rivadavia gave much praise to the album calling it the, "ultimate L.A. glam metal album", and called the band, "the first heavy metal band to truly cross over from the male to female audience, which automatically doubled the band’s fan-base-building prospects".

"Without this album, a lot of the great hair metal bands wouldn't have come about," observed Satchel of Steel Panther. "Theatre of Pain was more of their glam look, but Shout at the Devil was such a great record. It was fuckin' sick. They set the bar. People looked at that and said, 'Fuck, we gotta dress up cool, man.'Shout at the Devil peaked at No. 17 on the Billboard 200. The singles "Looks That Kill" and "Too Young to Fall in Love", peaked at No.54 and No.90 respectively on the Billboard Hot 100 in 1984, while "Shout at the Devil" peaked at No. 30 on the Mainstream Rock chart. The album was awarded 4× Platinum (reaching the four million mark in shipments) on May 15, 1997.

"When a band like us put out Shout at the Devil," Sixx observed in 2000, "and the label does zero marketing, zero publicity and takes zero trade adverts, and you sell five million records, then everybody starts patting themselves on the back. But it's Mötley Crüe that did that, not Elektra Records."

Track listing
All lyrics and music written by Nikki Sixx,
except where noted.

2003 remastered edition
In 2003, the band re-issued their albums on their own label Mötley Records, including added bonus tracks from each album's specific era. The bonus tracks of the remastered edition of Shout at the Devil are mainly composed of demos, but include also the previously unreleased song "I Will Survive", which was recorded in the same sessions. The song "Black Widow", included in the Red, White & Crüe compilation, was also recorded and left off this album. The track "Hotter than Hell" was later renamed and re-recorded into "Louder Than Hell" on the Theatre of Pain'' album. This edition also sports a warning that the album may contain masked backwards messages. This is in reference to Sixx and Lee chanting "Jesus is Satan" as an underdub on the title track.

A limited edition "Mini-LP" Compact Disc version of the album was released in the Japanese market, featuring the original cover that was previously available only on the vinyl LP release.

Personnel

Mötley Crüe
Vince Neil – lead vocals
Mick Mars – guitars, acoustic guitar, backing vocals
Nikki Sixx – bass, bass pedals, backing vocals
Tommy Lee – drums, backing vocals

Production
 Tom Werman – producer
 Geoff Workman – engineer
 Doug Schwartz - assistant engineer
 George Marino - mastering at Sterling Sound, New York
 Bob Defrin - cover art

Charts

Album

Singles

Certifications

References

1983 albums
Albums produced by Tom Werman
Elektra Records albums
Mötley Crüe albums
Music controversies